Cukas may refer to:
 Çükəş, Azerbaijan
 CUKAS